The Vicious Engine is a game engine that offers functionality for rendering, sound, networking, physics, game play scripting, and lighting. It was developed by Vicious Cycle Software, and was first released in January 2005. No additional third-party libraries are required, and all source code is included. It supports GameCube, Wii, WiiWare, Xbox, Xbox 360, Xbox Live Arcade, PlayStation 2, PlayStation Portable, PlayStation Network, and Microsoft Windows. The engine would become dormant as a part of the closure of Vicious Cycle Software in 2016.

Vicious Engine 2 
Vicious Engine 2 (sometimes stylized as Ve2) has been optimized for eighth-generation consoles and high-end PCs. It was released on March 25, 2009, at the Game Developers Conference. It features improvements for next-generation consoles, especially the Xbox 360 and PlayStation 3. D3P and Vicious Cycle Software's Eat Lead: The Return of Matt Hazard is the first retail title to use the new technology. In addition to the previous platforms, it supports PlayStation 3.

Games using the Vicious Engine 
300: March to Glory (2007)
Alien Syndrome (2007)
Curious George (2006)
Dead Head Fred (2007)
Spy vs. Spy (2005)
Dora the Explorer: Journey to the Purple Planet (2005)
Eat Lead: The Return of Matt Hazard (2009, PS3/X360)
Real Heroes: Firefighter (2009, Wii/Xbox One/PS4/Nintendo Switch)
Matt Hazard: Blood Bath and Beyond (2010, PS3/X360)
Flushed Away (2006)
Marvel Trading Card Game (2007)
Puzzle Quest: Challenge of the Warlords (2007, PSP port)
Hilton Garden Inn: Ultimate Team Play (2009, PSP)
Desi Adda: Games of India (2009, PS2/PSP)
Minute to Win It (2010, Wii/360)
Freekscape: Escape From Hell (2010, PS3/PSP)
Despicable Me (2010, PS3/PS2/PSP/Wii/NDS)
Man vs Wild: The Game (2011, PS3/360/Wii)
Earth Defense Force: Insect Armageddon (2011, PS3/360/PC)
Elements of Destruction (2008 PC/360)
Pac-Man and the Ghostly Adventures (2013, PS3/WiiU/3DS/360/PC)
Pac-Man and the Ghostly Adventures 2 (2014, PS3/WiiU/3DS/360)

References

External links 
 
 Interview with the president of Vicious Cycle Software regarding Vicious Engine from FiringSquard.com

Video game engines
Vicious Engine games